Bohdan Sluka (born September 12, 1988) is a Ukrainian footballer who plays as a midfielder.

Playing career 
Sluka signed a contract in 2006 with SC Tavriya Simferopol. After failing to make an appearance with Tavriya he signed with Nyva Ternopil in the Ukrainian First League. After a season in Ternopil he signed with FC Enerhetyk Burshtyn. In 2011, he played in the Ukrainian Second League with FC Hirnyk-Sport Horishni Plavni. He later played three seasons in the Ukrainian Amateur Football Championship with SCC Demnya, and made appearances in the 2015–16 Ukrainian Cup, and 2017–18 Ukrainian Cup.

In 2018, he played abroad in the Canadian Soccer League with FC Vorkuta. In his debut season with Vorkuta he assisted in securing the CSL Championship. The following season he was transferred to expansion franchise Kingsman SC for the 2019 season.

References  

1988 births
Living people
Ukrainian footballers
Association football midfielders
FC Nyva Ternopil players
FC Enerhetyk Burshtyn players
FC Hirnyk-Sport Horishni Plavni players
SCC Demnya players
FC Continentals players
Ukrainian First League players
Canadian Soccer League (1998–present) players
Ukrainian Second League players
Sportspeople from Lviv